A geniculum is a small genu, or angular knee-like structure. The term is often used in anatomical nomenclature to designate a sharp knee-like bend in a small structure or organ.

For example, in the facial canal, the genicular ganglion is situated on the geniculum of the facial nerve, the point where the nerve changes its direction.

References 

Anatomy